Hieronymus Dungersheim or Dungersheym von Ochsenfart(1465, Ochsenfurt – 1540) was a German Catholic theologian and controversialist (skeptic). A professor of the University of Leipzig, he was an early opponent of the Lutherans there.

Works
De modo discendi et docendi ad populum sacra seu de modo prædicandi (1513)
Schriften Gegen Luther Theorismata Duodecim Contra Lutherum, Articuli Sive Libelli Triginta, modern edition by Theobald Freudenberger (1987)  /

References
 Theobald Freudenberger (1988), Hieronymus Dungersheim von Ochsenfurt an Main, 1465-1540, Theologieprofessor in Leipzig: Leben und Schriften

Notes

External links

1465 births
1540 deaths
People from Ochsenfurt
16th-century German Catholic theologians
German male non-fiction writers
16th-century German male writers